Later Alligator is a 2019 point-and-click adventure game developed by American studio Pillow Fight in collaboration with SmallBü Animation. The game tasks players with exploring Alligator New York City and playing various mini-games to solve a mystery. The game was released on September 18, 2019 for Microsoft Windows, and MacOS. A Linux version was released the following December. A port for the Nintendo Switch was released on March 16, 2021, including a physical release through Fangamer.

Gameplay 

In Later Alligator, players control an unnamed individual who is hired by Pat, an anxious and paranoid alligator. Pat believes his family is going to murder him that night at something called "the Event", and asks for help in finding out their plans.

The player can travel to different areas of Alligator New York City to locate various members of Pat's family, asking each of them questions about themselves and the nature of the Event. To gain more information, the player must complete requests or challenges offered by each character, which take the form of different mini-games. These mini-games feature objectives such as achieving a set score on a pinball machine, solving a sliding puzzle, or completing a Tower of Hanoi style game about stacking pancakes. Some mini-games feature alternate reality game components, such as sending the player to an external website where the solution can be found. Players will be awarded a badge bearing a family member's likeness upon completing their associated mini-game. Collectible puzzle pieces can also be found scattered around the different environments, which are used in a later mini-game.

Each time the player plays a mini-game or travels to a different area, time passes on the in-game clock. When the clock reaches 8:00 PM, the player will be transported to the game's final mini-game, with the game's ending determined by the number of badges obtained. Upon finishing the game, the player is able to restart the story with all their badges and puzzle pieces retained, giving them the opportunity to play the mini-games they missed and collect the remaining badges to achieve the best ending.

Development 
Later Alligator was announced on November 29, 2018, with a set release date of Spring 2019. The game began as a collaboration between SmallBü Animation and Pillow Fight. The developers had met previously, where the idea of creating a game had been mentioned. A few months later, SmallBü pitched the idea for Later Alligator to Pillow Fight, and work on the game was started. SmallBü would animate, pitch ideas and write, and Pillow Fight would build prototypes and program the game. The mini-games were created to use simple concepts, in order to be easier to code and design.

One of the inspirations for the game's visual style came from a collection of photos "of old, ornate homes from the '50s and '70s" which helped contribute to the game's film noir style. According to Pillow Fight and SmallBü, the gameplay was inspired by Japanese visual novels and the Professor Layton series. The game was created over two years, and features over 80,000 frames of animation. One issue was the memory requirements for each animation, which became an issue when faced with a detailed scene with numerous animated elements. This was eventually fixed by packaging each PNG individually. The game was animated in Toon Boom Harmony, with some post-production work done in Adobe After Effects.

On September 18, 2019, Later Alligator launched for Windows and macOS on Steam and Itch.io.

Reception 
Later Alligator received positive reviews from critics who praised its animation and humor, but criticized some of its mini games as being repetitive. Polygon's Jeff Ramos praised the character interactions as being filled with charming animation and dialogue. Bryce O'Connor, writing for Adventure Gamers, liked the game's locations, saying "Exploring Alligator New York City is a joy, with each screen—from a dusty antique shop to the dark alley in the “unsavory part of town” to an Alligator Memorial Park—featuring fun details and things to interact with".

CGM's Kris Goorhuis liked the game's atmosphere, saying that "The game feels a certain way to look at – classy coffee counters and seedy bars more akin to small-town diners with colourful faces poised to say goofy things".

Nintendo World Report enjoyed the cartoon visuals of Later Alligator, saying that it provided a contrast with the game's film noir aesthetic. The reviewer also gave notice to the dialogue, writing that "interactions with the family are wacky, short conversations that highlight the idiosyncrasies of their individual personalities. Not one identical, and each brings their own brand of humor making the interactions feel unique". Nintendo Life's Kate Gray appreciated the animation style, saying that the game had a "unique style that's full of personality and charm". They criticized some of the minigame controls, saying that the cursor could be hard to control and could result in failing the minigame.

References 

2019 video games
Adventure games
Point-and-click adventure games
Linux games
MacOS games
Mystery video games
Nintendo Switch games
Video games about reptiles
Video games developed in the United States
Video games set in New York City
Windows games
Single-player video games
Video games with alternate endings